National Steel may refer to:

 National Steel Corporation (1929), a defunct steel production company in the United States
 National Steel Company (1899), part of the 1901 merger that created U.S. Steel
 National Steel and Shipbuilding Company, a shipyard in San Diego, California
 National Steel (album), a blues album by Colin James
 National Steel, a type of guitar made by the National String Instrument Corporation
 "National Steel", a song by Kathleen Edwards on the album Failer